Sky Hounds is a 1942 German war drama film directed by Roger von Norman and starring Malte Jaeger, Waldemar Leitgeb and Albert Florath.

The film's sets were designed by the art director Hermann Asmus. It was made at Babelsberg Studios with location shooting taking place at the Hornberg airfield.

Synopsis
The film portrays Hitler Youth learning to build and fly gliders in preparation for their joining the Luftwaffe when they are older.

Cast
 Malte Jaeger as Obertruppführer Kilian
 Waldemar Leitgeb as Standartenführer Hauff
 Albert Florath as Werkmeister Grundler
 Lutz Götz as Truppführer Schäfer
 Josef Kamper as Sturmführer Wagner
 Toni von Bukovics as Frau Grundler
 Klaus Pohl as Lagerkoch
 Erik Schumann as Werner Gundler, Himmelshund
 Volkmar Geiszer as Paul, Himmelshund
 Hermann Pack as Schulze, Himmelshund
 Horst Neutze as Petersen, Himmelshund
 Bernhard Schramm as Isemann, Himmelshund
 Hermann Dodel as Nägele, Himmelshund
 Harald Zusanek as Bannführer Friedrich
 Georg Vogelsang
 Erna Heidersdorf
 Edgar Hollot
 Siegmar Schneider
 Rudolf Vones

References

Bibliography

External links 
 

1942 films
1942 drama films
German drama films
Films of Nazi Germany
1940s German-language films
Films directed by Roger von Norman
German aviation films
Terra Film films
German black-and-white films
Films shot at Babelsberg Studios
1940s German films